Sangsadia Nirbachan 1991 (Bengali: সংসদীয় নির্বাচন ১৯৯১), is a military medal of Bangladesh. The medal was established in 1991. The medal is intended for awarding citizens of the country who took part in the organization of general parliamentary elections. Later, a medal with a similar design was established in 1996 and 2001. General Zia's widow, Khaleda Zia, led the Bangladesh Nationalist Party to victory in the 1991 general parliamentary election and became the first female prime minister in the country's history. However, the Awami League, led by Sheikh Hasina, one of the surviving daughters of Mujibur Rahman, came to power in the next elections in 1996, but lost again to the Bangladesh Nationalist Party in 2001.

References 

Military awards and decorations of Bangladesh